Hawkin's Bazaar was a British novelty gift and toy shop chain based in Norwich, England. Hawkin's Bazaar offered a range of unusual toys, gifts, gadgets and curiosities. They sourced out-of-the-ordinary products and offered something different, a range of toys and gifts that will appeal to many ages and tastes.

History 

The company known as Hawkin's Bazaar started life as a niche mail order toy company founded by Sid Templer in 1973 in Corbridge, Northumberland. The name of the company at that time, TOBAR, was from the first few letters of his son's forenames, Toby and Barnaby. Tobar remains the name of the parent company to this day.

In 1976 the mail order company moved premises into an old disused public house, formerly named the Hawk Inn, and decided to adapt the name for themselves as Hawkin's & Co; Bazaar was added to the name later.

In 1989 the company moved premises again to a former farm, Elm House in St Margaret South Elmham; Toby took over the running of the company from his father, Sid. It was also around this time that he company opened its first retail shop in Salisbury. In 1998 the company launched their websites, shortly after beginning to open retail locations across the United Kingdom. Also in the 1990s the company began to sell into the European markets and opened a European wholesale branch, TOBAR France in 2010.

In 2007 the company moved to a £10 million facility in Worlingham, before moving to Norfolk in 2013. Also in 2007 they launched a sub-brand, Stocking Fillers.

2013 marked the company's 40th year in business. Whilst a lot has changed since Hawkin's Bazaar launched as a mail order service, the company still refers to its original values with taglines such as “Unusual gifts for every occasion, since 1973” and “Suppliers to Father Christmas since 1973” adorning their mail order catalogues and other communications.

In addition to high street shops and mail order catalogues the company continues to operate online. Its website was updated and re-launched in August 2012.

2012 administration 
On 23 January 2012, Hawkin's Bazaar (and Tobar Group) were bought by Primary Capital from administration through a management buy-out although they did already own the company in the first place.

The company continued trading in 2012 and opened several additional stores towards the end of the year (some at previous sites). As of December 2012, the company had 27 stores open around the UK. During 2012 the Tobar Group achieved sales of over £20 million and employed 250 people.

In December 2015 the company was bought in a management buy-out supported by private equity firm Merino. While under the ownership of Merino, Tobar acquired Bluw Limited in 2016, a Scottish toy company, H Grossman (established 1946, Glasgow), in March 2018 and an educational company, Kit for Kids, in March 2019.

2020 administration 
In 2018 the company made a £978,344 loss on sales of £15.3 million. In August 2019 Merino put the business up for sale. The company entered administration for the second time on 23 January 2020, with Tom Straw and Simon Thomas being appointed as Joint Administrators. As of January 2020 Hawkin's Bazaar had 18 locations, all of which closed on 3 February.

The Hawkin's Bazaar brand was bought out of administration by H Grossman Ltd, a company owned by Tobar/Merino. Today H Grossman, controlled by Merino Industries Limited and Mark Colley, operate under not only under the Hawkin's Bazaar brand, but also Stocking Fillers and Tobar.

On November 22, 2021, Menkind bought Hawkin's Bazaar and Stocking Fillers from H Grossman for an undisclosed sum.

Location 

The company was founded in Corbridge, Northumberland, before moving to St Margarets and opening stores across the United Kingdom. From 2007 up to the end of 2012, Hawkin's Bazaar operated out of Beccles from The Old Aerodrome in Worlingham where the warehouse and head office were based. At the start of 2013 the company separated these two entities, with the warehouse moving to Eye, Suffolk and the head office to Norwich.

In addition to their UK operations Tobar have a warehouse in France, a presence in Scandinavia and a showroom in Hong Kong.

References

External links 

 Hawkin's Bazaar website

British companies established in 1973
Companies that have entered administration in the United Kingdom
Defunct retail companies of the United Kingdom
Retail companies established in 1973
Toy retailers of the United Kingdom